The 2015 Virginia Senate election was held on November 3, 2015, to elect all 50 members of the Virginia Senate. Republicans retained their 21–19 majority in the chamber.

Previous composition

Summary

Results by district

District 1

 -->

District 2

 -->

District 3

 -->

District 4

 -->

District 5

 -->

District 6

 -->

District 7

 -->

District 8

 -->

District 9

 -->

District 10

 -->

District 11

 -->

District 12

 -->

District 13

 -->

District 14

 -->

District 15

 -->

District 16

 -->

District 17

 -->

District 18

 -->

District 19

 -->

District 20

 -->

District 21

 -->

District 22

 -->

District 23

 -->

District 24

 -->

District 25

 -->

District 26

 -->

District 27

 -->

District 28

 -->

District 29

 -->

District 30

 -->

District 31

 -->

District 32

 -->

District 33

 -->

District 34

 -->

District 35

 -->

District 36

 -->

District 37

 -->

District 38

 -->

District 39

 -->

District 40

See also
2015 Virginia House of Delegates election
2015 Virginia elections

Notes

References

2015 Virginia elections
Virginia Senate elections
Virginia, Senate
November 2015 events in the United States